Allium calyptratum is a species of flowering plant in the Amaryllidaceae family. It is found in Israel, Syria, Palestine and Turkey. It is a bulb-forming perennial with an umbel of white flowers.

References

calyptratum
Onions
Flora of Israel
Flora of Palestine (region)
Flora of Turkey
Flora of Syria
Plants described in 1854
Taxa named by Pierre Edmond Boissier